The 1866 Texas gubernatorial election was held on June 25, 1866 to elect the governor of Texas. Incumbent Governor Andrew J. Hamilton, who had been appointed by President Andrew Johnson, did not run for a full term. The election was won by James W. Throckmorton, who received 80% of the vote.

Results

Aftermath
In March 1867, General Philip H. Sheridan was appointed military governor of the Fifth Military District. Citing the "impediment" Throckmorton presented "to the reconstruction of the State," Sheridan removed him from office and appointed Pease governor on July 30, 1867.

References

1866
Texas
1866 Texas elections